Lee Chao-ming is a Taiwanese politician. He was the Deputy Minister of the Hakka Affairs Council of the Executive Yuan in 2012–2013.

References

Political office-holders in the Republic of China on Taiwan
Living people
Taiwanese politicians of Hakka descent
Taiwanese people of Hakka descent
Year of birth missing (living people)